A waste weir on a navigable canal is a slatted gate on each canal level or pound, to remove excess water and to drain the canal for repairs or for the winter shutdown. This differs for a dam or reservoir, for which a waste weir is another name for a spillway, i.e. not having the boards to adjust the water height nor the paddles to drain all the water as on a canal, only to drain the excess.

Uses 

A canal will often need some means to maintain a water level. A canal constantly consumes water due to leakage, evaporation, and the operation of lift locks. Nevertheless, excess water from storms or emptying locks  could cause problems by eroding the banks of a canal, causing washouts, and flooding buildings or adjacent properties. Waste weirs were one of several measures used to remove surplus water. The waste weir also functioned as an opening to drain the entire canal prism of water for repairs, or for winter (to avoid damage from freezing water), or in anticipation of flooding.

In some cases when a creek was used to feed the canal, a waste weir was necessary for excess water from the creek. For instance, on the Morris Canal, the Lopatcong Creek went into the canal to feed it, but it had a tendency to flood, hence the need for a couple of waste weirs in the area around the bottom of Inclined Plane 9 West near Port Warren, New Jersey (near Strykers Road today).

Reservoirs and tanks also use a waste weir for flood discharges.

Design 

and 

where
g=gravitational constant of 
and Cd is the coefficient of discharge over the weir. 

Various values of Cd can be given as follows:

Construction 
Construction methods varied depending on the canal. On the Erie Canal and the Chesapeake and Ohio Canal, waste weirs were often constructed from masonry or concrete.

Law 
Since a waste weir was part of canal property, it would sometimes be explicitly protected by law. On the Morris Canal, New Jersey Statue 136 section 61 stated that for willfully and maliciously opening the gates of waste weirs the penalty was $25.

Gallery

References

Dams by type
Canals